Niemir, Niemirz, Niemierz –  is a male Slavic given name of Old Slavic origin, present in other Slavic nations (in different forms and spellings).

The name is composed of nie- (a negation) as well as -mir ("peace", "good", "great", "famous"), present in a number of other Slavic given names such as Mirogniew and Mirogod and related to Gothic naming element mērs, -mir, c.f. Theodemir, Valamir. 

Medieval texts from Mazovia  often substitute this given name in the form of Niemierza as Erasmus, a male given name derived from Ancient Greek. 
The name day for Niemir is celebrated on February 14 in Poland.

See also:
 Niemierzyn
 Niemierze
 Niemirowice
 Niemirki
 NiNiemirów — 4 settlements in Poland and 2 in Ukraine (Nemyriv)
 Niemirówka — 1 settlement in Poland, 2 in Ukraine (Nemyrivka), 1 in Moldova (Nimereuca)

References 

Slavic given names
Slavic words and phrases
Slavic-language surnames
Slavic toponyms
Slavic culture